Ubari Airport  is an airport serving Ubari, a city in the Wadi al Hayaa District of Libya.  It is mostly military, but has recently been used by Prepare2go for civil aviation flying safaris around the country.

The runway is asphalt, with a  concrete touchdown zone on each end.

The Ubari non-directional beacon (Ident: UBR) is located on the field.

Airlines and destinations

See also
Transport in Libya
List of airports in Libya

References

External links
OpenStreetMap - Ubari
OurAirports - Ubari Airport
FallingRain - Ubari Airport

Airports in Libya
Military installations of Libya